The 1996–97 season of the Montserrat Championship was the fourth recorded season of top flight association football competition in Montserrat, with records for any competition held between 1975 and 1995 not available. The competition was abandoned when the Soufrière Hills erupted, causing widespread devastation to the island.

Participating teams
The following five teams took part in the competition:

 Royal Montserrat Police Force
 Montserrat Volcano Observatory Tremors
 Seventh Day Adventists Trendsetters
 Ideal Boys
 N.N.

Known results
Only two results are known from the season: a 3–2 victory for the Tremors over the Police in the opening round, and a 4–3 victory for Ideal over the Trendsetters at an unknown stage of the competition.

References

1995 domestic association football leagues
1996 domestic association football leagues
1995 in Montserrat
1996 in Montserrat
Montserrat Championship seasons